Karen Waldron (née Mistal) is an American film and television actress and producer.

Originally from upstate New York, She has studied with several notable conservatories including, The Edgemar, The Improv, Darryl Hickman and The Charles Conrad Studio. Her credits include The New Adventures of Beans Baxter as well as a recurring role on Coach. Film credits include Space Cowboys, Return of the Killer Tomatoes, and Cannibal Women in the Avocado Jungle of Death. She was an executive producer of the Hallmark movie The Note.

Filmography

Film

Television

Additionally, Waldron has co-produced the TV movies At the Hands of Another, Inside the Circle, The Note and the TV series The Clinic.

External links
 

American film actresses
Living people
1961 births
21st-century American women